Wigmore Abbey was an abbey of Canons Regular with a grange, from 1179 to 1530, situated about a mile (2 km) north of the village of Wigmore, Herefordshire, England: grid reference SO 410713.
Only ruins of the abbey now remain and on Historic England's Heritage at Risk Register their condition is listed as 'very bad'.

History of the abbey
The founding of the abbey was contemplated by Ranulph de Mortimer in the reign of Henry I, but only brought to fruition by his son, Hugh de Mortimer, who had the abbey consecrated at Wigmore in 1179 in the parish of Leintwardine by Robert Foliot, the Bishop of Hereford. The construction of the abbey was also assisted by other local landowners, especially Brian de Brampton and his John, who contributed building materials from their woods and quarries. The abbey community had been some thirty years in moving through various sites in northern Herefordshire before this final consecration. In this it was one of the most moved foundations in the country, having been settled during these years occasionally at Shobdon, Llanthony Priory and Lye or Eye as it has been written.

At the time it has been suggested that this was the largest monastery in the county, followed by Abbey Dore and Leominster Priory.

The first abbot was Simon Merlymond.  Andrew of St Victor (–1175) was abbot from 1148–1155 and 1162–1175.

The abbey church, like the church at Wigmore, was dedicated to St James. As they were the principal patrons of the abbey, many members of the Mortimer family were buried there, among them five Earls of March.

The abbey continued to flourish until the period of the Dissolution of the Monasteries in 1530, when it was destroyed. The remains of the building were given to Sir T. Palmer.

Wigmore Abbey is thought to be the place of origin of a manuscript outlining its own history and founding, as well as the lineage of Roger Mortimer, whose father Edmund petitioned Parliament (successfully) to be named heir to the throne in 1374.  His claim was superseded by King Henry IV's accession to the throne. The manuscript concerning the Mortimers and the foundation of Wigmore Abbey is now housed at the University of Chicago.  Another chronicle has been lost, but copies of the beginning and the end of this have survived in Manchester and Dublin.

Burials
 Ranulph de Mortimer
 Stephen of Aumale and his wife, Hawise de Mortimer d'Aumale
 Roger Mortimer of Wigmore
 Maud de Braose, Baroness Mortimer
 Roger Mortimer, 1st Baron Mortimer
 Roger Mortimer, 1st Earl of March
 Joan de Geneville, 2nd Baroness Geneville
 Roger Mortimer, 2nd Earl of March
 Edmund Mortimer (1302–1331)
 Edmund Mortimer, 3rd Earl of March
 Roger Mortimer, 4th Earl of March
 Hugh de Mortimer and his wife, Maud le Meschin
 Edmund Mortimer, 2nd Baron Mortimer
 Margaret Mortimer, Baroness Mortimer
 Ralph de Mortimer

Recent history of the remains
The land encompassing the abbey remains was owned by the Powell family, and later by the Brierley family. Several fields have been purchased by local farmers. The ruins themselves were sold to British actor John Challis (best known as Boycie from Only Fools and Horses), who lived in the abbot's lodging from 1998 until his death in 2021. The Green Green Grass, starring John Challis, was filmed at Wigmore Abbey along with other locations in the area.

References

 Challis, John, (2016). Wigmore Abbey: The Treasure of Mortimer, Wigmore Books Ltd.
 Remfry, P.M., The Mortimers of Wigmore, 1066 to 1181. Part 1: Wigmore Castle
 Remfry, P.M., The Wigmore Chronicle, 1066 to 1377:A Translation of John Rylands Manuscript 215 and Trinity College, Dublin, MS.488, ff. 295-9

External links
 Guide to Wigmore Abbey chronicle and Brut chronicle. Manuscript, 14th and 15th centuries at the University of Chicago Special Collections Research Center

1179 establishments in England
Grade I listed buildings in Herefordshire
Monasteries in Herefordshire
Burial sites of the Mortimer family